Shaun Teale (born 10 March 1964 in Southport) is an English football manager and former professional footballer.

He played as a defender from 1983 until 2004 and was notably part of the League Cup winning team of Aston Villa in 1994.He also played in the Football League for AFC Bournemouth, Tranmere Rovers, Preston North End and Carlisle United, the Scottish Premier League for Motherwell. As well as having a spell in Hong Kong with Sing Tao he has played at a Non-league level for Weymouth, Southport, Burscough and Northwich Victoria before moving into management with the two latter clubs, as well as having a spell in charge of Chorley.

Playing career
He was a central defender who joined AFC Bournemouth from non-league Weymouth for £50,000 in 1989. He spent three seasons at Bournemouth before moving to Aston Villa in July 1991. He helped them finish runners-up in the Premier League in 1993 and win the Football League Cup a year later, before losing his place in the first team to Ugo Ehiogu.

He moved from Villa to join Tranmere Rovers for £500,000 in the summer of 1995. He made his Tranmere debut on 12 August 1995 against Wolves and played in 29 league games for Tranmere in his first season with them. Whilst with Rovers he had loan spells with Preston North End and Sing Tao SC, before signing for Motherwell in August 1998.

Teale moved from Motherwell to Carlisle United on a free transfer in February 2000, playing 20 games for the Cumbrian club. He then went on to join Southport, playing for them until the age of 40, before moving into non-league coaching and management.

Managerial career
Teale was appointed manager of Burscough, a team in the Northern Premier League Premier Division. Whilst he was there, the side won the 2003 FA Trophy, in the final of which he played.

Teale left Burscough six weeks after the Trophy win, and has since managed Northwich Victoria, a Football Conference team in the 2003/04 season. Teale left Northwich at the end of the 2003/04 season.

Between February 2005 and August 2006, Teale managed Northern Premier League First Division side Chorley, before leaving to run his pub and restaurant business in Burscough.

It was announced on 8 March 2013 he applied for the AFC Telford United with Peter Withe.

Personal life
Between 2008 and 2009, Teale was the owner of the Farmer's Arms pub in Burscough. On 3 September 2010, it was announced that Teale had come out of retirement to sign for Southport and District Sunday League Premier Division side The Herald.

References

External links
Shaun Teale career stats at Sporting-Heroes

1964 births
Living people
Footballers from Southport
English footballers
English Football League players
National League (English football) players
Premier League players
England semi-pro international footballers
Weymouth F.C. players
AFC Bournemouth players
Aston Villa F.C. players
Tranmere Rovers F.C. players
Expatriate footballers in Hong Kong
Preston North End F.C. players
Carlisle United F.C. players
Sing Tao SC players
Motherwell F.C. players
Burscough F.C. players
Southport F.C. players
Northwich Victoria F.C. players
English football managers
Northwich Victoria F.C. managers
Scottish Premier League players
Chorley F.C. managers
Burscough F.C. managers
Association football defenders
English expatriate sportspeople in Hong Kong
English expatriate footballers